Johnson Eguakhide Oghuma is a Nigerian politician who is representing Estako Federal constituency of Edo State.

References

External links 
 

Living people
Place of birth missing (living people)
Year of birth missing (living people)
Members of the House of Representatives (Nigeria)
Edo State politicians